The 1903 William & Mary Orange and White football team was an American football team that represented the College of William & Mary as a member of the Eastern Virginia Intercollegiate Athletic Association (EVIAA) during the 1903 college football season. Led by first-year head coach J. Merrill Blanchard, the Orange and White compiled an overall record of 3–3.

Schedule

References

William and Mary
William & Mary Tribe football seasons
William and Mary Orange and White football